The discography of Ligabue, the Italian rock-singer Luciano Ligabue, consists of thirteen studio albums, two compilation albums, one soundtrack albums, five live albums, sixty-six singles as a lead artist and four singles as a featured artist.

Albums

Studio albums

Soundtracks

Notes
 * Charted on the Italian FIMI Compilations Chart.

Compilation albums

Live albums

Singles

As lead singer

As featured artist

Notes
 x "Gli ostacoli del cuore" entered the Italian FIMI Top Digital Download, not the Italian FIMI Singles Chart.

Other charted songs

References

Discographies of Italian artists
Rock music discographies